On December 1, 1969, the Selective Service System of the United States conducted two lotteries to determine the order of call to military service in the Vietnam War in the year 1970, for men born from January 1, 1944 to December 31, 1950. These lotteries occurred during a period of conscription in the United States that lasted from 1947 to 1973. It was the first time a lottery system had been used to select men for military service since 1942. The lottery would establish the priority of call based on the birth dates of registrants.

Origins

The lottery of 1969 was conceived to address inequities in the draft system as existed previously, and to add more military personnel towards the Vietnam War. The war had arisen from a series of conflicts dating back to the early stages of French colonialism and Japanese occupation of Vietnam in World War II. In 1963, South Vietnamese generals seized power in Saigon in a coup. President Lyndon B. Johnson increased the number of U.S. personnel in South Vietnam due to the political instability in the country. More active US involvement in the war began in August 1964, when two U.S. warships were alleged to have been attacked by North Vietnamese torpedo boats. Johnson condemned North Vietnam, and Congress passed a motion which gave him more authority over military decisions. By the end of 1965, President Johnson had sent 82,000 troops to Vietnam, and his military advisors wanted another 175,000. Due to the heavy demand for military personnel, the United States increased the number of men the draft provided each month.

In the 1960s, anti-war movements started to occur in the U.S., mainly among students on college campuses and in more leftist circles. By the end of the decade, the anti-war movement included many veterans who had served in Vietnam as well as a lot of middle-class parents with draft-age sons. College students were entitled to a deferment (2-S status) but were subject to the draft if they dropped out, stopped making "normal progress" in community college (i.e., started a fifth semester before transferring to a four-year college) or graduated. In 1967, the number of U.S. military personnel in Vietnam was around 500,000. The war was costing the U.S. $25 billion a year, and many of the young men drafted were being sent to a war they wanted no part of. Martin Luther King Jr. also started to support the anti-war movement, believing the war to be immoral and expressing alarm at the number of African-American soldiers that were being killed.

November 15, 1969, marked the largest anti-war protest in the history of the United States. It featured many anti-war political speakers and popular singers of the time. Many critics at the time saw Richard Nixon as a liar; when he took office, he claimed that he would begin to withdraw American troops from Vietnam. After ten months of being in office, the president had yet to start withdrawals, and U.S. citizens felt he had lied. Later, President Nixon claimed to have been watching sports as the anti-war demonstration took place outside the White House.

After much debate within the Nixon administration and Congress, Congress decided that a gradual transition to an all-volunteer force was affordable, feasible, and would enhance the nation's security. On November 26, 1969, Congress abolished a provision in the Military Selective Service Act of 1967 which prevented the president from modifying the selection procedure ("...the President in establishing the order of induction for registrants within the various age groups found qualified for induction shall not effect any change in the method of determining the relative order of induction for such registrants within such age groups as has been heretofore established..."), and President Richard Nixon issued an executive order prescribing a process of random selection.

Method

The 366 days of the year (including February 29) were printed on slips of paper. These pieces of paper were then each placed in opaque plastic capsules, which were then mixed in a shoebox and then dumped into a deep glass jar. Capsules were drawn from the jar one at a time and opened.

The first number drawn was 258 (September 14), so all registrants with that birthday were assigned lottery number 1. The second number drawn corresponded to April 24, and so forth. All men of draft age (born January 1, 1944 to December 31, 1950) who shared a birth date would be called to serve at once. The first 195 birthdates drawn were later called to serve in the order they were drawn; the last of these was September 24.

Also on December 1, 1969, a second lottery, identical in process to the first, was held with the 26 letters of the alphabet. The first letter drawn was "J", which was assigned number 1. The second letter was "G", and so on, until all 26 letters were assigned numbers. Among men with the same birthdate, the order of induction was determined by the ranks of the first letters of their last, first, and middle names. Anyone with initials "JJJ" would have been first within the shared birthdate, followed by "JGJ", "JDJ", and "JXJ"; anyone with initials "VVV" would have been last.

A random procedure will not distribute the lottery numbers uniformly over the months of the year, but this was what some people expected. It happened that November and December births, or numbers 306 to 366, were assigned mainly to lower draft order numbers representing earlier calls to serve. This led to complaints that the lottery was not truly random as the legislation required. Only five days in December—December 2, 12, 15, 17, and 19—were higher than the last call number of 195. Had the days been evenly distributed, 14 days in December would have been expected to remain uncalled. From January to December, the rank of the average draft pick numbers were 5, 4, 1, 3, 2, 6, 8, 9, 10, 7, 11, and 12. A Monte Carlo simulation found that the probability of a random order of months being this close to the 1–12 sequence expected for unsorted slips was 0.09%. An analysis of the procedure suggested that "The capsules were put in a box month by month, January through December, and subsequent mixing efforts were insufficient to overcome this sequencing".

Aftermath and modification 

The draft lottery had social and economic consequences because it generated further resistance to military service. Those who resisted were generally young, well-educated, healthy men. Reluctance to serve in Vietnam led many young men to try to join the National Guard, aware that the National Guard would be unlikely to send soldiers to Vietnam. Many men were unable to join the National Guard even though they had passed their physicals, because many state National Guards had long waiting lists to enlist. Still other men chose legal sanctions such as imprisonment, showing their disapproval by illegally burning their draft cards or draft letters, or simply not presenting themselves for military service. Others left the country, commonly moving to Canada.

The 1960s were a time of turmoil in the United States, beginning with the civil rights movement which set the standards for practices by the anti-war movement. The 1969 draft lottery only encouraged resentment of the Vietnam War and the draft. It strengthened the anti-war movement, and all over the United States, people decried discrimination by the draft system "against low-education, low-income, underprivileged members of society". The lottery procedure was improved the next year although public discontent continued to grow.

For the draft lottery held on July 1, 1970 (which covered 1951 birthdates for use during 1971, and is sometimes called the 1971 draft), scientists at the National Bureau of Standards prepared 78 random permutations of the numbers 1 to 366 using random numbers selected from published tables. From the 78 permutations, 25 were selected at random and transcribed to calendars using 1 = January 1, 2 = January 2, ... 365 = December 31. Those calendars were sealed in envelopes. Twenty-five more permutations were selected and sealed in 25 more envelopes without transcription to calendars. The two sets of 25 envelopes were furnished to the Selective Service System.

On June 2, an official picked two envelopes, thus one calendar and one raw permutation. The 365 birthdates (for 1951) were written down, placed in capsules, and put in a drum in the order dictated by the selected calendar. Similarly, the numbers from 1 to 365 were written down and placed into capsules in the order dictated by the raw permutation.

On July 1, the drawing date, one drum was rotated for an hour and the other for a half-hour (its rotating mechanism failed). Pairs of capsules were then drawn, one from each drum, one with a 1951 birthdate and one with a number 1 to 366. The first date and number drawn were September 16 and 139, so all men born September 16, 1951, were assigned draft number 139. The 11th draws were the date July 9 and the number 1, so men born July 9 were assigned draft number 1 and drafted first.

Draft lotteries were conducted again from 1971 to 1975 (for 1952 to 1956 births). The birth year of 1952 was the last draftees, with the assigned number 95 being the last number drafted, which represented those born on July 20, 1952. The draft numbers issued from 1972 to 1975 were not used to call any men into service as the last draft call was on December 7, and authority to induct expired July 1, 1973. They were used, however, to call some men born from 1953 to 1956 for armed forces physical examinations. The highest number called for a physical was 215 (for tables 1970 through 1976). Between 1965 and 1972 the draft provided 2,215,000 service members to the U.S. military.

Present-day use
In the present, not much has changed regarding how the draft would be conducted if it were required in the future. The Selective Service Committee, which presides over draft procedures, has stored the large tumbler that holds all the numbers and dates that would be drawn to select candidates, and the only obvious change between the method of the past and the present is that instead of using pieces of paper in blue capsules, the SSC now uses ping-pong balls with the dates and numbers on them.

See also
 Conscription in the United States

References

External links
 Landscaper.net (2009). The Military Draft and 1969 Draft Lottery for the Vietnam War. Last modified 2009-03-24. Confirmed 2011-05-26. — contemporary news stories, images of Official Orders (call to physical exam, call to report), lottery results, Draft Board classifications, Vietnam troop levels, induction statistics 1917–73. 
 David Lane (2003). Introduction to Graphs: Clearing Up the Draft with Graphs. Connexions. 18 July 2003. Confirmed 2011-05-26. — list of draft ranks, additional analysis.
 Selective Service System (2009). The Vietnam Lotteries. SSS: History and Records. Last updated 2015-09-19.
 Norton Starr (1997). "Nonrandom Risk: The 1970 Draft Lottery". Journal of Statistics Education 5.2 (1997). Confirmed 2011-05-26. — The online edition includes instructions for getting the data online and a lesson plan for statistics class using the 1970 and 1971 draft lottery data.
 
 

Vietnam War
Conscription in the United States
1969 in military history
December 1969 events in the United States
1969 establishments in the United States
1973 disestablishments in the United States
Lotteries in the United States